Redwood Forest Trail is a 1950 American Western film directed by Philip Ford and written by Bradford Ropes. The film stars Rex Allen, Jeff Donnell, Carl Switzer, Jane Darwell, Marten Lamont and Pierre Watkin. The film was released on September 18, 1950, by Republic Pictures.

Plot

Cast
Rex Allen as Rex Allen
Jeff Donnell as Julie Westcott
Carl Switzer as Sidekick Alfie
Jane Darwell as Hattie Hickory
Marten Lamont as Craig Danvers
Pierre Watkin as Arthur Cameron
Jimmy Ogg as Two Bits
Dickie Jones as Mighty Mite 
John L. Cason as Henchman Curley 
Jim Frasher as Wyomin' 
Bobby Larson as Chips 
Ward Wood as Henchman Matt Mason 
Jack Larson as Dusty
Ted Fries as Hawk
Joseph Granby as Bart Bryant
Bob Burns as Sam Westcott

References

External links 
 

1950 films
American Western (genre) films
1950 Western (genre) films
Republic Pictures films
Films directed by Philip Ford
American black-and-white films
1950s English-language films
1950s American films